The Bandit of Zhobe is a 1959 British CinemaScope adventure film directed by John Gilling and starring Victor Mature, Anne Aubrey and Anthony Newley. In British India a bandit goes on a rampage in the mistaken belief that the British have killed his family, which later proves to not be the case. It was produced by Albert Broccoli for Warwick Films and features extensive use of footage from Gilling's previous Zarak.

Plot
A bandit with a price on his head, is seen this time blind for revenge.
He thinks that the British have massacred his people, his family, his wife and child. But he is wrong.
Only the little romantic daughter of his enemy, overflowing with pity for him, could open his eyes to the truth.

Cast
 Victor Mature as Kasim Khan 
 Anne Aubrey as Zena Crowley 
 Anthony Newley as Corporal Stokes 
 Norman Wooland as Major Crowley 
 Dermot Walsh as Captain Saunders 
 Walter Gotell as Azhad 
 Paul Stassino as Hatti 
 Larry Taylor as Ahmed 
 Murray Kash as Zecco 
 Sean Kelly as Lieutenant Wylie 
 Denis Shaw as Hussu 
 Maya Koumani as Tamara

Production
The film was known as The Bandit. Filming started 11 August 1958.

Critical reception
Variety said "it cannot be taken seriously."

TV Guide wrote, "it's all chase and melodrama with little care for characterizations."
The Radio Times called it a "very silly Northwest Frontier romp, with Victor Mature in dark make-up as Kasim Khan...romantic interest from forgotten starlet Anne Aubrey and some wince-inducing comic mugging from Anthony Newley. Quite a lot of money was thrown at it, but this remains a B-movie at heart."
Sky Movies called the film "a fiery 19th century adventure yarn that makes little sense but bulges with action that keeps coming at you."

References

External links

1959 films
CinemaScope films
British historical adventure films
1950s historical adventure films
Films directed by John Gilling
Films set in the British Raj
Columbia Pictures films
1950s English-language films
1950s British films